Angle Township is a township in Lake of the Woods County, Minnesota, United States. The population was 119 at the 2010 census. At 49.22° north latitude, it is the northernmost township in Minnesota and the Contiguous United States. (See extreme points of the United States and Northwest Angle.) The unincorporated communities of Oak Island, Angle Inlet and Penasse are located in the township.

Geography
According to the United States Census Bureau, the township has a total area of 596.3 mi2 (1,544.5 km2); 123.1 mi2 (318.8 km2) is land and 473.2 mi2 (1,225.7 km2) (79.63%)  water.

The initial establishment of Angle Township being in the United States was due to a map-maker's error. Benjamin Franklin and British representatives established the initial U.S. and Canadian borders in the Treaty of Paris in 1783 from a map that misrepresented the source of the Mississippi River.

In 1997, in order to change what were considered unequal fishing regulations between the U.S. and Canada, Angle Township resident Gary Dietzler utilized this cartographical mishap to implement a mock secession from the United States, going so far as to get a bill issued by their Congressman Collin Peterson (D) in the U.S. House of Representatives. The mock secession succeeded in getting fishing regulations better synchronized across these international (fresh) waters.

Demographics
As of the census of 2000, there were 152 people, 71 households, and 48 families residing in the township. The population density was 1.2/mi2 (0.5/km2). There were 272 housing units at an average density of 2.2/mi2 (0.9/km2). The racial makeup of the township was 100% White. Hispanic or Latino of any race were 0.66% of the population (1 person).

There were 71 households, out of which 14.1% had children under the age of 18 living with them, 63.4% were married couples living together, 1.4% had a female householder with no husband present, and 31.0% were non-families. 23.9% of all households were made up of individuals, and 5.6% had someone living alone who was 65 years of age or older. The average household size was 2.14 and the average family size was 2.53.

In the township the population was spread out, with 14.5% under the age of 18, 3.3% from 18 to 24, 21.1% from 25 to 44, 48.7% from 45 to 64, and 12.5% who were 65 years of age or older. The median age was 50 years. For every 100 females, there were 120.3 males. For every 100 females age 18 and over, there were 124.1 males.

The median income for a household in the township was $28,500, and the median income for a family was $31,250. Males had a median income of $28,500 versus $21,250 for females. The per capita income for the township was $13,932. About 13.3% of families and 12.3% of the population were below the poverty line, including none of those under the age of 18 or 65 and older.

References

Townships in Lake of the Woods County, Minnesota
Enclaves and exclaves
Townships in Minnesota